Fatima Zahra Bennacer (Arabic : فاطمة الزهراء بناصر; born 30 October 1981), is a Moroccan actress. She started her artistic career in 1997 and played in many productions. She became famous for her role in the TV series "An hour in hell" as Sophia, and her role as the rebelling girl in the Ramadan TV serie Akba Lik.

Films 
 2014 : Formatage
 2015 : Without a family
 2015 : Hmimou
 2018 : Urgent

Discography 
 (ar) Hamam lkhla (حمام لخلا)
 (ar) Goliya (قوليا)
 (ar) Kif nessma (كيف نسمة)
 (ar) Liyam (ليام)
 (ar) baa m3aya (بقا معيا)
 (ar) zahwiya (زاهوية)
 (ar) Maktouaa mn chajra (مقطوع من شجرة)

References 

1981 births
Living people
Moroccan television actresses